Roll The Dice (band) is an analogue electronic duo from Stockholm, Sweden signed to The Leaf Label. A self-titled debut album was released in 2010 on Digitalis Recordings  and a second full length is released in 2011. 

The band is composed of Peder Mannerfelt and Malcolm Pardon. Mannerfelt, also known as The Subliminal Kid, produces and performs live with Fever Ray. Pardon was a member of Kinky Machine in the early 90s but left the band when he emigrated to Sweden to pursue a career in TV and film composition.

Members
Malcolm Pardon
Peder Mannerfelt

Discography

Studio albums
Roll The Dice - (2010) Digitalis Recordings
In Dust - (2011) The Leaf Label
Until Silence - (2014) The Leaf Label

EPs
Live In Gothenburg - August 7, 2010 (2011) The Leaf Label

References

External links
Official website
Roll The Dice on The Leaf Label

Swedish electronic music groups